Cathal Kelly is a Canadian novelist and sports columnist for The Globe and Mail. He won the Stephen Leacock Memorial Medal for Humour in 2019 for his childhood memoir Boy Wonders.

Kelly was born and raised in Toronto, Ontario to immigrant parents from Ireland. He studied political science at the University of Toronto, and journalism at Ryerson University, before joining the Toronto Star as a copy editor in the early 2000s. He began writing for the paper as a beat reporter covering the Toronto Blue Jays, as well as writing some automobile and travel journalism, before becoming a full-time sports columnist in 2005. He transferred to The Globe and Mail in 2014.

References

21st-century Canadian non-fiction writers
21st-century Canadian male writers
Canadian male non-fiction writers
Canadian sportswriters
Canadian memoirists
Canadian humorists
Toronto Star people
The Globe and Mail columnists
Writers from Toronto
Living people
Canadian people of Irish descent
University of Toronto alumni
Toronto Metropolitan University alumni
Year of birth missing (living people)
Stephen Leacock Award winners
21st-century memoirists
Hockey writers